Portsmouth International Airport at Pease , formerly known as Pease International Airport, is a joint civil and military use airport located one nautical mile (2 km) west of the central business district of Portsmouth, a city in Rockingham County, New Hampshire, United States. It is owned by the Pease Development Authority. It is included in the Federal Aviation Administration (FAA) National Plan of Integrated Airport Systems for 2017–2021, in which it is categorized as a non-hub primary commercial service facility.

The airport is located within the Pease International Tradeport, a result of the ongoing redevelopment of the former Pease Air Force Base which was closed under Base Realignment and Closure (BRAC) Commission action in the late 1980s and early 1990s.

Usage

Military
The airport shares its runway with the Pease Air National Guard Base, which is actively utilized by the 157th Air Refueling Wing (157 ARW) of the New Hampshire Air National Guard, an Air Mobility Command (AMC)-gained Air National Guard unit operating KC-46A Pegasus aerial refueling tankers. The 64th Air Refueling Squadron (64 ARS), an active duty Air Force unit of the 22nd Air Refueling Wing (22 ARW) at McConnell AFB, is also embedded and located with the 157 ARW at Pease ANGB.

Pease was one of seven Launch Abort Sites and one of 18 Emergency Landing Sites for NASA Space Shuttle orbiters.

Civilian
Domestic and international terminal passenger service by the third iteration of Pan American Airways began in 1999 and lasted until the airline's demise in 2004; other past operators include Business Express / Delta Connection (1993–?), Allegiant Air (2005–2007), and Skybus Airlines (2007-2008).  Frontier Airlines began offering service to their hub in Orlando, Florida, on December 6, 2018, but abandoned the route after only 6 months.

Allegiant Air returned in October 2013, and offers service to several destinations.  An expanded passenger terminal opened on January 22, 2021, for customers of Allegiant Air.

The airport is the current base for PlaneSense, a company that offers fractional aircraft ownership programs.

Facilities and aircraft

It has one concrete and asphalt paved runway designated 16/34 which measures 11,322 by 150 feet (3,451 x 46 m).

For the 12-month period ending September 30, 2019, the airport had 42,282 aircraft operations, an average of 116 per day: 68% general aviation, 10% military, 17% air taxi and 4% scheduled commercial. At that time there were 132 aircraft based at this airport: 96 single-engine, 12 multi-engine, 16 jet, 6 helicopter and 2 military.

In May 2019, the Pease Development Authority approved a $24 million runway reconstruction project, which was completed in September 2020.

In December 2021, work was completed on a $19.5 million passenger terminal expansion project. Improvements included an updated and expanded passenger state-of-the-art holding area with floor-to-ceiling windows providing passengers with vast views of the entire runway, a dedicated baggage screening room with new conveyer belts and an automatic X-ray baggage scanning system for TSA personnel, more expedient and advanced screening capabilities through the addition of a second security station for improved passenger flow, about 4,000 square feet of upgraded concession space with conventional bar and high top table seating, a new gate and second jet bridge to allow seamless processing of two gets coming in and out at the same time if needed, and an indoor service animal relief area (SARA) room.

Airlines and destinations

Statistics

Top destinations

Airline market share

Count includes enplaned arriving and departing passengers.

Annual traffic

Accidents at or near PSM
Civilian aircraft incidents at or near the airport, per National Transportation Safety Board (NTSB) records:
 On April 10, 1993, a Cessna 172 traveling from Greater Binghamton Airport (BGM) in New York to Beverly Regional Airport (BVY) in Massachusetts diverted to PSM due to low visibility, made several attempts to land, and ultimately crashed in nearby Durham, New Hampshire, after running out of fuel; the pilot was seriously injured. Another pilot had taken off from Lawrence Municipal Airport (LWM) in Massachusetts in an attempt to guide the plane to safety.
 On October 9, 2004, a Cessna 172M traveling from Bar Harbor Airport (BHB) in Maine to Skyhaven Airport (DAW) in New Hampshire had to land in a corn field in nearby Eliot, Maine, after running out of fuel; neither the pilot or passenger were injured. The pilot had been unable to land at Skyhaven due to low visibility and was en route to PSM when the incident occurred.

A number of incidents, some with fatalities, occurred during military use of the facility.

References

External links
 Portsmouth International Airport at Pease official website
 
 

Airports in New Hampshire
Buildings and structures in Portsmouth, New Hampshire
Transportation buildings and structures in Rockingham County, New Hampshire
Newington, New Hampshire